A parasitic cone (also adventive cone or satellite cone) is the cone-shaped accumulation of volcanic material not part of the central vent of a volcano. It forms from eruptions from fractures on the flank of the volcano. These fractures occur because the flank of the volcano is unstable. Eventually, the fractures reach the magma chamber and generate eruptions called flank eruptions, which, in turn, produce a parasitic cone.

A parasitic cone can also be formed from a dike or sill cutting up to the surface from the central magma chamber in an area different from the central vent.

A peculiar example of multiple parasitic cones is Jeju Island in South Korea. Jeju features 368 "oreums" ("mount"), which lie in a roughly lateral line on either side of the island's central dormant shield volcano Hallasan.

See also
Flank crater

References

External links

  How Volcanoes Work: Volcano Types

 
Volcanology

ca:Con volcànic#Cons satèl·lit